Branthwaite is a surname, and may refer to:

 Jarrad Branthwaite (born 2002), English footballer
 John Branthwaite (1927–2014), New Zealand priest
 William Branthwaite (died 1619), English scholar and translator

English-language surnames
English toponymic surnames